Bernard John Maguire was an Irish politician, farmer and company director. Maguire stood unsuccessfully for election at the June 1927 general election. He was first elected to Dáil Éireann as a Fianna Fáil Teachta Dála (TD) for the Leitrim–Sligo constituency at the September 1927 general election. He was re-elected for the same constituency at the 1932 and 1933 general elections. At the 1937 general election he was elected for the Leitrim constituency and was re-elected for this constituency at the 1938 general election.

In 1939, he left the Fianna Fáil party, and was elected as an Independent TD at the 1943 general election. He was re-elected as an independent TD for Leitrim at the 1944 general election and for Sligo–Leitrim at the 1948 general election. He lost his seat at the 1951 general election but regained it at the 1954 general election. He again lost his seat at the 1957 general election.

References

Year of birth missing
Year of death missing
Fianna Fáil TDs
Independent TDs
Irish farmers
Members of the 6th Dáil
Members of the 7th Dáil
Members of the 8th Dáil
Members of the 9th Dáil
Members of the 10th Dáil
Members of the 11th Dáil
Members of the 12th Dáil
Members of the 13th Dáil
Members of the 15th Dáil
Politicians from County Leitrim